The 2014–15 New Mexico Lobos men's basketball team represented the University of New Mexico during the 2014–15 NCAA Division I men's basketball season as a member of the Mountain West Conference. They played their home games at The Pit in Albuquerque, New Mexico. The Lobos were led by second year head coach Craig Neal. They finished the season 15–16, 7–11 in Mountain West play to finish in eighth place. They lost in the first round of the Mountain West tournament to Fresno State.

Previous season 
The Lobos finished the season with an overall record of 27–7, 15–3 in the Mountain West to finish in second place. In the Mountain West Conference tournament, the Lobos defeated Fresno State, Boise State, and San Diego State to become the tournament champions, their third consecutive title. The Lobos received an automatic bid to the 2014 NCAA tournament as a 7–seed in the South Region. They were defeated by Stanford, 53–58 in the Round of 64.

Offseason

Departures

Incoming transfers

2014 recruiting class

Roster

Schedule

|-
!colspan=12 style="background:#D3003F; color:white;"| Exhibition
|-

|-
!colspan=12 style="background:#D3003F; color:white;"| Regular season

|-
!colspan=12 style="background:#D3003F; color:white;"|  Mountain West tournament

References

New Mexico Lobos men's basketball seasons
New Mexico
2014 in sports in New Mexico
2015 in sports in New Mexico